Best of the Rest is a compilation album by the American Southern rock band Lynyrd Skynyrd. It was originally released in 1982 and again in 1990 on CD. This compilation contains album cuts that are fan favorites. The only hit from the band on the album is "Call Me the Breeze." The compilation also contains two previously unreleased early recordings from 1971 and 1972. Those songs were originally planned to be on their shelved debut album, making (Pronounced 'Lĕh-'nérd 'Skin-'nérd) their actual debut. The early songs were recorded at Muscle Shoals Sound Studio in Alabama. Other early songs from 1971-72 also surfaced on the compilations Skynyrd's First and... Last in 1978 and Old Time Greats in 1997.

Track listing
"I've Been Your Fool" (Allen Collins, Gary Rossington, Ronnie Van Zant) - 4:28
"Gotta Go" (Allen Collins, Gary Rossington, Ronnie Van Zant) - 4:30
"I'm a Country Boy" (Allen Collins, Ronnie Van Zant) - 4:24
"Double Trouble" (Allen Collins, Ronnie Van Zant) - 2:51
"Workin' for MCA" (Live) (Ed King, Ronnie Van Zant) - 4:25 (This version is the same one that's used on One More from the Road, except there's a fade-out at the end of the song.)
"Call Me the Breeze" (J.J. Cale) - 5:08
"I Never Dreamed" (Steve Gaines, Ronnie Van Zant) - 5:21
"T for Texas (Blue Yodel #1)" (Live) (Jimmie Rodgers) - 8:35

Track 3 from Nuthin' Fancy (1975)
Track 4 from Gimme Back My Bullets (1976)
Tracks 5 (Full Version) and 8 from One More from the Road (1976)
Track 6 from Second Helping (1974)
Track 7 from Street Survivors (1977)
Tracks 1 and 2 are previously unreleased

Live Songs

Track 5 recorded 7/7/1976 at the Fox Theatre in Atlanta, Georgia
Track 8 recorded 7/8/1976 at the Fox Theatre in Atlanta, Georgia

References

1990 greatest hits albums
1982 greatest hits albums
Albums produced by Tom Dowd
Lynyrd Skynyrd compilation albums
MCA Records compilation albums